Hot Rocks 1964–1971 is a compilation album by the Rolling Stones released by London Records in December 1971. It became the Rolling Stones' best-selling release of their career and an enduring and popular retrospective.  The album includes a mixture of hit singles, such as "Jumping Jack Flash", B-sides such as "Play with Fire", and album tracks such as "Under My Thumb" and "Gimme Shelter", the last of which has become one of the Rolling Stones' most popular and highly regarded songs. The album artwork depicts five nested silhouettes of the band members' profiles taken by rock photographer Ron Raffaelli in 1969. A photograph of the band at Swarkestone Hall Pavilion, taken by Michael Joseph in 1968, was printed on the back cover of the vinyl release.

The album is the best selling of the numerous Decca/ABKCO releases after the Rolling Stones lost control of their pre-1971 catalogue to their former manager Allen Klein. As with all of such releases, the Stones had no control over the collection or its release.

Release and reception

Hot Rocks 1964–1971 peaked at No. 4 on the Billboard 200 album chart and, as of March 2023, the album has spent 403 weeks on the chart. The album was certified 12× platinum by the Recording Industry Association of America. The album was not released in the UK until 21 May 1990, to coincide with the Urban Jungle Tour, reaching No. 3 and, as of March 2023, it has spent 348 weeks on the UK Top 200.

Robert Christgau rated the album a B−, writing "If you don't like the Stones, this might serve as a sampler... Look, here's how it works. Except for Satanic Majesties, which isn't represented here, all of their '60s studio albums are musts."

In August 2002, Hot Rocks 1964–1971 was reissued in a new remastered CD and SACD digipak by ABKCO Records.

Track listing
All songs by Mick Jagger and Keith Richards, except where noted.

Notes
All tracks on sides one and two were produced by Andrew Loog Oldham. All tracks on sides three and four were produced by Jimmy Miller, except "Midnight Rambler", which was produced by the Rolling Stones and Glyn Johns.

Charts

Weekly charts

Year-end charts

Certifications

See also
List of best-selling albums in the United States

References

1971 greatest hits albums
ABKCO Records compilation albums
London Records compilation albums
The Rolling Stones compilation albums
Albums produced by Andrew Loog Oldham
Albums produced by Jimmy Miller